Billy the Kid's Smoking Guns is a 1942 American Western film directed by Sam Newfield and written by Milton Raison and George Wallace Sayre. The film stars Buster Crabbe, Al St. John, Dave O'Brien, John Merton, Milton Kibbee and Ted Adams. The film was released on May 1, 1942, by Producers Releasing Corporation.

Plot

Cast           
Buster Crabbe as Billy the Kid
Al St. John as Fuzzy Jones
Dave O'Brien as Jeff Travis
John Merton as Morgan
Milton Kibbee as Dr. Hagen
Ted Adams as Sheriff Carson
Karl Hackett as Hart
Frank Ellis as Carter
Slim Whitaker as Roberts
Budd Buster as Rancher
Joel Newfield as Dickie Howard
Joan Barclay as Mrs. Howard

See also
The "Billy the Kid" films starring Buster Crabbe: 
 Billy the Kid Wanted (1941)
 Billy the Kid's Round-Up (1941)
 Billy the Kid Trapped (1942)
 Billy the Kid's Smoking Guns (1942)
 Law and Order (1942) 
 Sheriff of Sage Valley (1942) 
 The Mysterious Rider (1942)
 The Kid Rides Again (1943)
 Fugitive of the Plains (1943)
 Western Cyclone (1943)
 Cattle Stampede (1943)
 The Renegade (1943)
 Blazing Frontier (1943)
 Devil Riders (1943)
 Frontier Outlaws (1944)
 Valley of Vengeance (1944)
 The Drifter (1944) 
 Fuzzy Settles Down (1944)
 Rustlers' Hideout (1944)
 Wild Horse Phantom (1944)
 Oath of Vengeance (1944)
 His Brother's Ghost (1945) 
 Thundering Gunslingers (1945)
 Shadows of Death (1945)
 Gangster's Den (1945)
 Stagecoach Outlaws (1945)
 Border Badmen (1945)
 Fighting Bill Carson (1945)
 Prairie Rustlers (1945) 
 Lightning Raiders (1945)
 Terrors on Horseback (1946)
 Gentlemen with Guns (1946)
 Ghost of Hidden Valley (1946)
 Prairie Badmen (1946)
 Overland Riders (1946)
 Outlaws of the Plains (1946)

References

External links
 

1942 films
American Western (genre) films
1942 Western (genre) films
Producers Releasing Corporation films
Films directed by Sam Newfield
American black-and-white films
1940s English-language films
1940s American films